District 1 is a district of Melilla, Spain. It includes the area of the old city citadel, the so-called "Melilla la Vieja" or "El Pueblo", and it features historic buildings, casemates and some modern blocks.

References 

 

Melilla